Choy Jin-ho  is a South Korean scientist. He was a professor in the department of chemistry at Seoul National University from 1981 to 2004, and thereafter a distinguished professor and director of the Center for Intelligent Nano-Bio Materials (CINBM) at Ewha Womans University.

Education 

Choy received his B.S. (1971) and M.S. degrees (1973) in chemical engineering from Yonsei University in Seoul. Afterwards he received a diploma in 1975 from the UNESCO Post-Graduate Course in Chemistry and Chemical Engineering, Research Laboratory of Engineering Materials, Tokyo Institute of Technology, Japan. He then moved to Germany, where he earned his PhD (1979) in inorganic chemistry at the Ludwig Maximilian University of Munich.

Work 

Choy was a professor in the department of chemistry at Seoul National University (1981-2004). He is currently a distinguished professor and director of the Center for Intelligent Nano-Bio Materials (CINBM) at Ewha Womans University. He held multiple visiting professorships:

 Laboratoire de Chimie du Solide du CNRS, Universite de Bordeaux I, France (1985-1986), 
 Department of materials engineering, University of Illinois at Urbana Champaign, United States (2003), 
 Kumamoto University, Japan (2008)
 Honorary Professor of Australian Institute for Bioengineering and Nanotechnology at The University of Queensland, Australia.

He was a member of the international editorial board (IEB) or an associate editor of the Journal of Material Chemistry, Materials Research Bulletin, and Chemistry of Materials, and is currently involved in various journals including Journal of Solid State Chemistry, Solid State Sciences, Chemistry – An Asian Journal as an IEB member.

Awards 

 Korean Chemical Society (1997), 
 National science award in chemistry from the South Korean government (2000), 
 Distinguished Service Knight Medal from the French Government (Palmes Academiques Chevalier dans l’Ordre des Palmes Academiques: 2003)
 1st Class National Science Medal (2006)
 Korean Best Scientist Award from the President of South Korea (2007)
 Role Model in Science from the South Korean government
 Award of Fellow from the Royal Society of Chemistry, UK (2008)
 Culture award in science from Seoul City (2010)
 Academic award from Ewha Womans University (2012). 
 Permanent member of Korean Academy of Science and Technology (2002).

References

External links 
 Homepage at Ewha Womans University

1948 births
Living people
South Korean chemists
Yonsei University alumni
Tokyo Institute of Technology alumni
Ludwig Maximilian University of Munich alumni
Academic staff of Seoul National University
Academic staff of Ewha Womans University
Solid state chemists